Go Crazy may refer to:

Go Crazy (album), a 2014 album by 2PM, or the title track
"Go Crazy" (Chris Brown and Young Thug song)
"Go Crazy" (Fat Joe and Remy Ma song)
"Go Crazy" (Young Jeezy song)
"Go Crazy", an episode of My Sister Sam
"Go Crazy", a song by Megan Thee Stallion featuring Big Sean and 2 Chainz from Good News

See also
I Go Crazy (disambiguation)
"Let's Go Crazy", a 1984 song by Prince and The Revolution